is a former Japanese football player.

Playing career
Sato was born in Aomori Prefecture on April 9, 1971. After graduating from high school, he joined NKK in 1990. He played several matches in every season. However the club was disbanded end of 1993 season. In 1994, he moved to Kyoto Purple Sanga. He played many matches as left side midfielder and left side back. In 1999, he moved to newly was promoted to J2 League club, Omiya Ardija. He retired end of 1999 season.

Club statistics

References

External links

violeta.co.jp
kyotosangadc

1971 births
Living people
Association football people from Aomori Prefecture
Japanese footballers
Japan Soccer League players
J1 League players
J2 League players
Japan Football League (1992–1998) players
NKK SC players
Kyoto Sanga FC players
Omiya Ardija players
Association football midfielders